Agnes of Rochlitz (died 1195) came from the Wettin family and was daughter of Dedi III, Margrave of Lusatia and his wife, Matilda of Heinsburg. She is also known as Agnes of Wettin.

Agnes married Berthold IV, Duke of Merania. From this marriage Agnes gained the titles of Duchess of Merania and Countess of Andechs.

In 1186, Agnes' husband accompanied Henry VI, Holy Roman Emperor, to the Kingdom of Sicily. In 1189, he led the third division of the imperial army and was its standard-bearer on the Third Crusade.

Issue 
Agnes and Berthold had:
Otto I, who succeeded his father
Ekbert, bishop of Bamberg
Henry, margrave of Istria
Saint Hedwig, wife of Henry I the Bearded, duke of Silesia 
Gertrude, who married Andrew II of Hungary
Agnes, disputed consort of Philip II of France
Berthold, Patriarch of Aquileia

References

Sources

External links 

1195 deaths
12th-century German women
Year of birth unknown
Daughters of monarchs